This is a list of the 6 members of the European Parliament for Cyprus in the 2019 to 2024 session.

List

Party Representation

References 

2019
List
Cyprus